Joseph Penzer (1833 – 26 September 1905) was an English-born Australian politician.

He was born in Birmingham in 1833, a farmer's son. He arrived in New South Wales around 1854, and settled in Grafton, where he kept a store. He moved to the Dubbo region in 1862, where he was a pastoralist. He was appointed a magistrate in 1864.

On 14 April 1879 he married Jane Rebecca Booth, the sister of Robert Booth, with whom he had two sons, Walter and Robert.

In 1887 he was elected to the New South Wales Legislative Assembly as a Free Trade member for Bogan. He did not re-contest in 1889.

Penzer died at Yarrandale near Dubbo in  1905 (aged 72).

Notes

References

 

1830 births
1905 deaths
Members of the New South Wales Legislative Assembly
Free Trade Party politicians
19th-century Australian politicians